In computing, a mouseover, mouse hover or hover box is a graphical control element that is activated when the user moves or hovers the pointer over a trigger area, usually with a mouse, but also possible with a digital pen. Mouseover control elements are common in web browsers. For example, hovering over a hyperlink triggers the mouseover control element to display a URL on the status bar. Site designers can define their own mouseover events using JavaScript or Cascading Style Sheets. 

Mouseover events are frequently used in web design and graphical user interface programming.

It is also known as rollover, which refers to a button created by a web developer or web designer, found within a web page, used to provide interactivity between the user and the page itself. The term rollover in this regard originates from the visual process of "rolling the mouse cursor over the button" causing the button to react (usually visually, by replacing the button's source image with another image), and sometimes resulting in a change in the web page itself. The part of the term 'roll' is probably referring to older mice which had a mechanical assembly consisting of a hard rubber ball housed in the base of the mouse (which rolls) contrary to the modern optical mouse, which has no rolling parts.

Rollovers can be done by imagery, text or buttons. The user only requires two images/buttons (with the possible addition of "alt" text to these images) to perform this interactive action. Rollover imagery can be done either by a program with a built-in tool or script coding. The user will have to pick a first image and select an alternate secondary image. A mouse action will have to be set to either "click on"  or "mouse over" in order for the rollover to be triggered. When the mouseover moves on the image, the alt image/secondary image will appear but won't stay - when the user "mouses out" by moving the mouse away from the image, the original source image will reappear.

Tooltip 

A special usage of mouseover event is a tooltip which shows a short description of the object under the pointer. The tooltip appears only after the mouse or stylus is held over the object for a certain amount of time.

On images, these may be produced using the HTML title attribute.

Examples 
<!-- Direct usage is not recommended. It does not conform with web standards. -->
<img id="myImage" src="/images/myImage.jpg" onMouseOver="alert('your message');">

// JavaScript code without any framework
<ref>var myImg = document.getElementById('myImage');</ref>
function myMessage() {
    alert('your message');
}

if (myImg.addEventListener) { //addEventListener is the standard method to add events to objects.
    myImg.addEventListener('mouseover', myMessage, false);
}

else if (myImg.attachEvent) { //For Internet Explorer
    myImg.attachEvent('onmouseover', myMessage);
}

else { //For other browsers
    myImg.onmouseover = myMessage;
}

// jQuery example. It degrades well if JavaScript is disabled in the client browser.
$("img").mouseover(function(){
   alert('your message');
});

References

External links 
Hidden CSS Menu A multilevel mouseover-menu in pure CSS (i.e. no JavaScript)
DontClick.it Demonstration of navigation using only mouseover (requires Flash Player)

Graphical control elements